American Homes 4 Rent, doing business as AMH, is a real estate investment trust based in Las Vegas, Nevada, that invests in single-family rental homes. As of December 31, 2019, the company owned 52,552 homes in 22 states. Its largest concentrations are in Atlanta (9.3% of total homes), Dallas-Fort Worth (8.4% of total homes), and Charlotte, North Carolina (7.2% of total homes).

History
The company was established in October 2012 by B. Wayne Hughes, the founder of Public Storage. It was one of the first large public companies to begin investing heavily in single-family homes, following the entry of The Blackstone Group into the field in 2012. Early funding for the company included a $600 million investment from the Alaska Permanent Fund.

In August 2013, the company became a public company via an initial public offering.

In March 2016, the company merged with American Residential Properties, Inc.

In January 2023, the company announced a branding change from American Homes 4 Rent to AMH in a public news release and a notice to investors.

See also
History and impact of institutional investment in housing in the United States

References

External links

2012 establishments in California
2013 initial public offerings
American companies established in 2012
Companies based in Agoura Hills, California
Companies listed on the New York Stock Exchange
Real estate companies established in 2012
Real estate investment trusts of the United States